The following are the international rankings of Taiwan.

Demographics

Economy

GDP 

 GDP sector composition in 2017
Agriculture: 1.8%
Industry: 36%
Services: 62.1%

Finance

Trade & Quality of Living

Energy

Electricity

Greenhouse Gas Emissions

Natural gas

Oil

Renewable Energy

Geography

Health 

 Health expenditure per capita in 2006: ranked 32 out of 194 countries.
 Infant mortality rate in 2011: 4.3 per 1000 births; ranked 187 out 225 countries.

Crime 
According to OSAC 2016 safety report Overall Crime and Safety Situation was classifies as low criminality.

Industry

Mass media

Military

Politics

Quality of life 

† if ranked

Education

Sport 

As Taiwan

Transportation

Tourism

Communications

See also

 Lists of countries
 Lists by country
 List of international rankings

References 

International rankings
Taiwan